The Township of Georgian Bay is an area municipality of the District Municipality of Muskoka, in south-central Ontario, Canada. It is located on the Severn River, where it empties into the eponymous Georgian Bay. The municipal offices are at Port Severn.

This township is the administrative centre of the Moose Deer Point Ojibway First Nation reserve.

Local Government 
Georgian Bay is governed by a mayor, two district councillors and four councillors, with each councillor representing each of the four municipal wards. The Mayor of Georgian Bay represents the town on the Muskoka County Council. As of the 2022 election, the elected council members are:

Mayor: Peter Koetsier

District Councillors:

 Wards 1 & 3: Brian Bochek
 Wards 2 & 4: Peter Cooper

Councillors:

 Ward 1: Steven Predko
 Ward 2: Stephen Jarvis
 Ward 3: Kristian Graziano
 Ward 4: Allan Hazelton

Communities

The township contains the communities of Bayview Park, Big Chute, Cedar Nook, Crooked Bay, Franceville, Go Home, Honey Harbour, Macey Bay, MacTier, Moon River, Potters Landing, South Bay, Wolverine Beach and Wood Landing.

Honey Harbour serves as a launching point to the "30,000 Islands" that make up the Georgian Bay geography. The islands, that are accessible from Honey Harbour, are dotted with hundreds to thousands of cottages.  The cottages serve mostly as summer residences.  Many very large cottages have been built recently, which has resulted in an increase in property values.  The economic cycle of Honey Harbour is tied to the cycle of the cottagers. Honey Harbour has a small grocery store ("Towne Centre" and Picnic Island Resort, which features its own general store and gas bar), a post office, a liquor store, a bakery, a Catholic church and school, a public elementary school, several small craft stores, a large resort (the "Delawana Resort"), and several marinas. In addition to cottages, there are multiple waterfront trailer park resorts. There are also numerous clean beaches lining both the shore and islands, inhabited by the diverse Ontario wildlife.

The double H's of Honey Harbour are a play on founder's name Harvey Hewitt of Pasadena, California. Hewitt was also the original pioneer and co-developer of Woolite.

Demographics 

Water bodies 

 Gibson Lake
 Gloucester Pool
 Go Home Lake
 Six Mile Lake
 Severn River
 Georgian Bay
 Stewart Lake
 Bear Lake

Culture

Library
There are library branches in Honey Harbour and MacTier, and a satellite library branch in the new Township Community Services Building in Port Severn.  These libraries are popular destinations for recreational reading materials, DVDs, and tourist information. Services include information and reference services, access to full text databases, community information; internet access, reader's advisory services, programs for children, youth and adults, delivery to homebound individuals, interlibrary loan, and free downloadable audiobooks.

Items within the libraries' collection are business directories, phone books, maps, government publications, books, periodicals, genealogy, local history.

Transportation
Intercity motor coach service to MacTier is available through Ontario Northland along its Toronto–Barrie–Parry Sound–Sudbury route's local schedule; it is bypassed by express schedules, but still receives twice-daily service northbound and southbound.

See also
List of townships in Ontario

References

External links

Township municipalities in Ontario
Lower-tier municipalities in Ontario
Municipalities in the District Municipality of Muskoka